Soldiers Lake is located  southeast of Flagstaff in the state of Arizona. The facilities are maintained by Coconino National Forest division of the USDA Forest Service.

Fish species
 Channel Catfish
 Walleye
 Northern Pike
 Bluegill
 Largemouth Bass
 Golden Shiner
 Crayfish

References

External links
 Arizona Fishing Locations Map
 Arizona Boating Locations Facilities Map
 Video of Soldiers Lake
 

Lakes of Arizona
Lakes of Coconino County, Arizona
Coconino National Forest